South Stone Airlines, is a privately owned passenger charter airline in South Sudan since 2016.

Location
The airline maintains its headquarters in the city of Juba, the capital of South Sudan.

History
South Stone Airlines was established in 2016. As of October 2019, the airline is listed as "Active" at the ch-aviation website.

Destinations
As of October 2019, Sky Travel and Aviation maintained services to the following destinations:
South Sudan
Juba: Juba International Airport (main hub)
Yambio: Yambio Airport

Fleet
The Sky Travel and Aviation fleet consisted of the following aircraft as of April 2016.

Accidents and incidents
On Saturday 4 June 2016, an Antonov An-30A-100 registration 	TN-AHP, owned by South Stone Airlines, landed at Yambio Airport, overshot the runway, crossed the highway and came to a stop in a potato field. The nose landing gear collapsed and the aircraft received substantial damage. All 30 occupants survived.

See also

 List of airlines of South Sudan

References

External links

Airlines of South Sudan
Airlines established in 2016
2016 establishments in South Sudan
Companies based in Juba